Jean Résal (22 October 1854, in Besançon – 14 November 1919, in Paris) was a French civil engineer. He was a professor of mechanical engineering at the École polytechnique, and designed several metal bridges in France, especially bridges above the Seine in Paris:

The career of the brilliant student of the École des ponts ParisTech was always an upward ladder: service in the Roads and Bridges Department at the Loire-Atlantique Département and thereafter in the shipping authority in Paris. Résal succeeded the student of Saint-Venant, Alfred-Aimé Flamant (1839-1915), at the Chair of Strength of Materials at the École des ponts ParisTech in 1892. Although Résal had already published a two-volume work on arch bridges together with Ernest Degrand (1822-1892), he concentrated on the theory and practice of steel bridges from a very early stage and had a profound influence on steel bridges at the transition from the discipline-formation to the consolidation period of theory of structures.

 Nantes Résal Bridge (rail), destroyed during the Second World War, rebuilt in concrete
 Road bridge over the Erdre (Nantes), appointed first bridge Barbin, then Pont du General de la Motte Rouge.
 Mirabeau bridge in Paris (road bridge, 93 m range)
 Alexandre-III Bridge (Paris) (highway bridge, 107 m range)
 Bercy bridge (Paris)
 Gateway Debilly (Paris)
 Bridge of Notre-Dame (Paris)

The bold steel arches of the Pont Général-de-la-Motte-Rouge (1885) in Nantes, Pont Mirabeau (1896) in Paris, Pont de l'Université (1899), Pont Alexandre III (1900) and Pont Notre-Dame (1914) in Paris set standards for steel bridges. All those bridges listed could only be built as a result of Résal’s research into elasticity and the strength of structural steels, work that he summarised in a monograph (1892). Furthermore, Résal made a lasting contribution to earth pressure theory (1903, 1910), which Albert Caquot would use successfully as his starting point.

Works 
Ponts métalliques, 2 Volumes 1885,  Online
mit Ernest Degrand: Ponts en maçonnerie, 2 Volumes, 1887,  Volume 1 Online Volume 2 Online
Constructions métalliques, élasticité et résistance des matériaux, fonte, fer et acier, 1892, Online
Résistance des matériaux. Cours de l'École des ponts et chaussées, 1892; 1922, Online
mit Amédée Alby: Notes sur la construction du pont Alexandre III, 1899
Stabilité des constructions. Cours de l'École des ponts et chaussées, 1901,  Online
Poussée des terres, stabilité des murs de soutènement, 1903,  Online
Cours de ponts métalliques professé à l'École nationale des ponts et chaussées. Ponts en arcs et ponts suspendus, 3 Bände, 1912–1922, Online

Achievements

References

French bridge engineers
People from Besançon
1854 births
1919 deaths